Valayapatti is a village in Virudhunagar district, Tamil Nadu, India.

Its pincode is 626127.

Population : around 1500.

Famous temples in Valayapatti:
Kaaliyamman Temple

Senthatti Ayyanar Temple

Sellimariyamman Temple

Oorani Pillaiyar

Venkatesha Perumal Temple

Schools:
Valayapatti has a primary school called Hindu Primary School.

References

Villages in Virudhunagar district